The siege of Nicaea by the forces of Orhan I from 1328 to 1331, resulted in the conquest of a key Byzantine Greek city by the Ottoman Turks. It played an important role in the expansion of the Ottoman Empire.

Background

Following the recapture of Constantinople from the Latins, the Byzantines concentrated their efforts on restoring their hold on Greece. Troops had to be taken from the eastern front in Anatolia and into the Peloponnese, with the disastrous consequence that what land the Nicaean Empire held in Anatolia was now open to Ottoman raids. With the increasing frequency and ferocity of raids, Byzantine imperial authorities pulled back from Anatolia.

Siege

By 1326, lands around Nicaea had fallen into the hands of Osman I. He had also captured the city of Bursa, establishing a capital dangerously close to the Byzantine capital of Constantinople. In 1328, Orhan, Osman's son, began the siege of Nicaea, which had been in a state of intermittent blockade since 1301. The Ottomans lacked the ability to control access to the town through the lakeside harbour. As a result, the siege dragged on for several years without conclusion.

In 1329, Emperor Andronicus III attempted to break the siege. He led a relief force to drive the Ottomans away from both Nicomedia and Nicaea. After some minor successes, however, the force suffered a reverse at Pelekanon and withdrew. When it was clear that no effective Imperial force would be able to restore the frontier and drive off the Ottomans, the city proper fell on 2 March 1331. Those inhabitants who wished to leave were permitted to do so, though few did.

Aftermath

for a short period, the town became the capital of the expanding Ottoman Emirate, The large church of Hagia Sophia in the center of the town was converted into the Orhan Mosque, and a medrese (theological school) and hamam (bathhouse) were built nearby, and The inhabitants of Nicaea were quickly incorporated into the growing Ottoman nation, and many of them had already embraced Islam by 1340.

The patriarch of Constantinople John XIX wrote a message to the people of Nicea shortly after the city was seized. His letter says that "The invaders endeavored to impose their impure religion on the populace, at all costs, intending to make the inhabitants followers of Muhammad". Patriarch advised the Christians to "be steadfast in your religion" and not to forget that the "Agarians [Turks] are masters of your bodies only, but not of your souls."

The Moroccan traveler Ibn Battuta stayed in Nicaea at the end of 1331, According to Ibn Battuta, the town was in ruins and only inhabited by a small number of people in the service of the sultan. Within the city, walls were gardens and cultivated plots with each house surrounded by an orchard. The town produced fruit, walnuts, chestnuts, and large sweet grapes.

Nicaea had been in Turkish hands before. It was reconquered by the First Crusade through Byzantine diplomacy in 1097. It had served as the capital of the Greek emperors during the period of the Latin Empire from 1204 to 1261. It was the most important Asian city in the Empire at the time of its fall to Osman. The Ottoman conquests continued apace and Nicomedia fell in 1337. Hence, this long-held history of Nicaea in the Greco-Roman hands irreversibly ended. It had been under Greco-Roman control since the conquest of Alexander the Great, and it was the seat of several milestones Christian councils.

See also

References

 R.G. Grant, Battle: A Visual Journey Through 5,000 Years of Combat, Dorling Kindersley Publishers Ltd, 2005. 

Conflicts in 1328
Conflicts in 1329
Conflicts in 1330
Conflicts in 1331
Nicaea
Nicaea
Nicaea
1320s in the Byzantine Empire
History of Bursa Province
Nicaea
1330s in the Byzantine Empire
1328 in the Ottoman Empire
Byzantine Bithynia